The Jacobs–Wilson House, also known as  Tabor Swiss Chalet, is a Swiss Chalet-style house in Portland, Oregon that was listed on the National Register of Historic Places in 1981.

Built in 1913, it is a two-and-a-half-story wood-frame house built on a native stone foundation.  It was the first house built on Thorburn Avenue, on the west slope of Mt. Tabor, in an area which eventually developed into a fine residential neighborhood.  It has an expansive view across the valley of the Willamette River to Portland's west hills.

The house is said to have been built to plans from Switzerland, and to have met a request of Bolina Jacobs to her son Frederick Alva Jacobs.

See also
 National Register of Historic Places listings in Southeast Portland, Oregon

References

Houses on the National Register of Historic Places in Portland, Oregon
Houses completed in 1913
1913 establishments in Oregon
Mount Tabor, Portland, Oregon
Portland Historic Landmarks